Çayüstü can refer to the following villages in Turkey:

 Çayüstü, Batman
 Çayüstü, Bigadiç
 Çayüstü, Dinar
 Çayüstü, Oltu
 Çayüstü, Suluova